Almario Vizcayno (born Almario Macario Vizcayno on November 4, 1981) is a Filipino athlete, coach, chef and restaurant owner. He is one of the famous athletes throughout the Philippines. He graduated from the University of Santo Tomas ( B.S. in Physical Education, 1999) and the Sergio Osmeña Sr. High School. Vizcayno is one of the veteran members of the Philippine National Fencing Team with Richard Gomez.

Biography and Career 
Viscayno is the second child of Elfredo Viscayno and Virgina Viscayno; they live in Quezon City, Manila. He has three siblings, Oniong, Maylin and Ching. He attended his high-school years in Sergio Osmeña Sr. High School. He took up B.S. in Physical Education at the University of Santo Tomas, being a student and an athlete at the same time. He became one of the head fencing coaches at De La Salle University.

Awards 
 Bronze Medalist- 1998 Asian Youth Fencing Championships, Foil Individual 
 Gold Medalist- 22nd Southeast Asian Games, Men's Team Épée
 Gold Medalist- 24th Southeast Asian Games, Men's Team Épée
 Gold Medalist- 2009 Dayrit's Cup Fencing Tourney 
 Gold Medalist- 2010 Dayrit's Cup Fencing Tourney 
 Gold Medalist- 2011 Dayrit's Cup Fencing Tourney 
 Gold Medalist- 1st LAMS Trophée, Open Men's Épée 
 Gold Medalist- 2nd LAMS Trophée, Open Men's Épée 
 Gold Medalist- 3rd LAMS Trophée, Open Men's Épée

References

External links
 

1981 births
Filipino male épée fencers
Filipino chefs
Filipino restaurateurs
Filipino sports coaches
Living people
Sportspeople from Quezon City
Businesspeople from Metro Manila
University of Santo Tomas alumni
Fencers at the 2006 Asian Games
Asian Games competitors for the Philippines
Filipino male foil fencers